Ion Testemiţanu (born 27 April 1974) is a Moldovan former footballer and current assistant manager of the Moldovan national football team.

He was signed by Benny Lennartson at Bristol City in 1998 and also played under Tony Pulis in 1999. He credits the Welsh manager with helping him settle in the United Kingdom. Testimiţanu played 4 games for Moldova in UEFA Euro 2008 qualifying.

He is featured in Tony Hawks' book, Playing the Moldovans at Tennis, where he lost to the author 11–4.

International goals 
Scores and results list Moldova's goal tally first.

References

External links

1974 births
Living people
Footballers from Chișinău
Moldovan footballers
Moldovan expatriate footballers
Moldova international footballers
Association football defenders
FC Zimbru Chișinău players
Moldovan Super Liga players
Bristol City F.C. players
Seongnam FC players
Ulsan Hyundai FC players
K League 1 players
FC Akhmat Grozny players
Shamakhi FK players
FC Sheriff Tiraspol players
Expatriate footballers in Azerbaijan
Expatriate footballers in Russia
Expatriate footballers in England
Expatriate footballers in South Korea
Moldovan expatriate sportspeople in South Korea
FC Sibir Novosibirsk players